FabricLive.21 is a DJ mix compilation album by Meat Katie, as part of the FabricLive Mix Series.

Track listing
  Lee Coombs & David Phillips - Banned Practice - Thrust Recordings
  Albino Allstars - Can You Hear Me - Tagsta
  2 tracks mixed
  Ithaka - So Get Up (Acapella) - Kaos Records Portugal
  Figures featuring Ithaka - Phat Prick - Kingsize Records
  Virtualmismo - Mismoplastico (Lee Coombs Back To The Phuture Mix) - Expanded Music
  Tim Wright - Oxygen (Abe Duque Remix) - Mute
  Meat Katie & Elite Force - Nu-Tron - Kingsize Records
  2 tracks mixed
  Unkle Ft. Ian Brown - Reign (Acapella) - Global Underground
  Infusion - Better World (Infusion Remix) - BMG
  Jem Stone & J.C. - Disco Daze - Finger Lickin' Records
  Elite Force - Shadow Box - Kingsize Records
  Metric - Stale - Lot 49
  Force Mass Motion - Out Of it - Lot 49
  Vigi & Nectarios - 2 C Beat (EK Remix) - Streetwise Records
  Dylan Rhymes - Salty (Meat Katie Remix) - Kingsize Records
  Koma & Bones - Get Down - Lot 49
  Vandal - Mad As Hell - Lot 49
  Circuit Breaker - Gateway - Lot 49
  Atomic Hooligan Ft. Sweet Hustler - Shine A Light (Introspective Remix) - Botchit & Scarper

External links
Fabric: FabricLive.21

2005 compilation albums